Dardasht is a central neighbourhood of Isfahan, Iran. Formerly known as Babol-Dasht, it is known for its historical minarets, cemetery, the Darb-i Imam Shrine, dated to 1453/857 AH and the Harun-i Vilayat Mausoleum. The Dardasht quarter of Isfahan was one of the major Jewish quarters of the city.

Notable people
Yona Dardashti - master classical Persian vocalist 
Galeet Dardashti - descendant of Yona Dardashti, vocalist and anthropologist

References

Isfahan
Jewish cemeteries
Jewish communities
Jews and Judaism in Persia and Iran